Tyrus Omondi (born 7 December 1994) is a Kenyan international footballer who plays for Kenya Commercial Bank, as a midfielder.

Career
Omondi has played club football for Mathare United and Kenya Commercial Bank.

He made his international debut for Kenya in 2016.

References

1994 births
Living people
Kenyan footballers
Kenya international footballers
Mathare United F.C. players
Kenya Commercial Bank S.C. players
Kenyan Premier League players
Association football midfielders